Augusto Pedro de Sousa (born 5 November 1968), known as Augusto César or simply Augusto, is a Brazilian football coach and former player who played as either a left back or a midfielder.

Playing career
Born in Brasília, Federal District, Augusto César was spotted by Vasco da Gama at the age of 19, playing the 1988 Campeonato Carioca on loan at America-RJ. He then represented Gama and Pires do Rio before joining Goiás in 1992.

Augusto César moved to Portuguesa in 1997, as a replacement to Zé Roberto. In July 1999, he agreed to a contract with Corinthians, but was rarely used at the latter club.

Augusto César was sent out on loan to Botafogo in February 2000, but returned to Corinthians in the following month after having paperwork problems; the issue was later solved, but he still featured sparingly. He subsequently represented América Mineiro in that year before returning to Bota in 2001; he would appear rarely for the club again, however.

In June 2001, Augusto César moved abroad, after signing for Kashima Antlers. He only returned to Brazil in 2006 with Brasiliense, after spending three seasons at Kawasaki Frontale.

Augusto César returned to his former side Gama in 2008, and subsequently played for Paranoá and Brasília before retiring in 2009, aged 40.

Managerial career
Shortly after retiring, Augusto César took up coaching in his last club Brasília, in the 2009 Série D. Ahead of the 2011 season, after managing Gama's under-20 squad, he was appointed in charge of Botafogo-DF, managing Túlio Maravilha while at the club.

Dismissed by Botafogo in April 2011, Augusto César took over former side Gama for the 2012 campaign, but was sacked in March of that year.

On 27 September 2012, Augusto César rejoined another club he represented as a player, Goiás, as an under-20 manager. He was also an interim manager of the main squad in the 2015 campaign, before the arrival of Julinho Camargo.

Augusto César was relieved of his duties by Goiás on 12 January 2016, after a poor performance in the year's Copa São Paulo de Futebol Júnior. In September 2017, after working at Pires do Rio's under-20 side and Sobradinho, he returned to Goiás and their under-20 squad, again as manager.

Interim of the first team for a short period during the 2018 season, Augusto César was definitely appointed manager of the main squad on 17 November 2020, after the dismissal of Enderson Moreira.

Career statistics

Honours

Player
Gama
Campeonato Brasiliense: 1990

Goiás
Campeonato Goiano: 1994, 1996

Corinthians
Campeonato Brasileiro Série A: 1999
FIFA Club World Cup: 2000

Kashima Antlers
J1 League: 2001
J.League Cup: 2002

Kawasaki Frontale
J2 League: 2004

Brasiliense
Campeonato Brasiliense: 2006

References

External links

Kawasaki Frontale Profile

1968 births
Living people
Footballers from Brasília
Association football defenders
Association football midfielders
Brazilian footballers
Campeonato Brasileiro Série A players
Campeonato Brasileiro Série B players
Sociedade Esportiva do Gama players
CR Vasco da Gama players
America Football Club (RJ) players
Goiás Esporte Clube players
Associação Portuguesa de Desportos players
Sport Club Corinthians Paulista players
Botafogo de Futebol e Regatas players
América Futebol Clube (MG) players
Brasiliense Futebol Clube players
Brasília Futebol Clube players
C.F. Os Belenenses players
J1 League players
J2 League players
Kashima Antlers players
Kawasaki Frontale players
Brazilian expatriate footballers
Brazilian expatriate sportspeople in Portugal
Brazilian expatriate sportspeople in Japan
Expatriate footballers in Portugal
Expatriate footballers in Japan
Brazilian football managers
Campeonato Brasileiro Série A managers
Campeonato Brasileiro Série D managers
Brasília Futebol Clube managers
Associação Botafogo Futebol Clube managers
Sociedade Esportiva do Gama managers
Goiás Esporte Clube managers
Sobradinho Esporte Clube managers